Nut farm may refer to:

 Nut production, on farms or plantations
 Insane asylums, owing to colloquial use of "nut" to refer to the insane
 The Nut Farm, a 1935 American film

See also
 Nufarm, an Australian agricultural chemical company